Remedy is a 2005 American crime drama directed by Christian Maelen and written by Sandy Eiges, Nicholas Reiner, and Charlotte Wise.  The film stars Maelen, Arthur Nascarella, Jon Doscher, Frank Vincent, Vincent Pastore, and Chuck Zito.

Production
Filming took place during April and May 2003, in New Jersey and New York City. The film was produced by Starline Films. Producer Jon Doscher, a native of Woodcliff Lake, New Jersey, chose to feature several Woodcliff Lake natives in the film, including former Woodcliff Lake Mayor Josephine Higgins, who played the part of an ambulance driver.

The film features the debut acting performance of Ace Frehley in a non-Kiss related appearance.  He also contributes to the soundtrack.

Synopsis 
The film is about a New York City-based artist who claims to have witnessed his best friend's murder.  Due to a drug problem, he cannot recall what happened, and is the prime suspect.  He desperately tries to remember before it is too late.

Partial cast

 Arthur J. Nascarella as Detective Lynch
 Christian Maelen as Will Bentley
 Jon Doscher as Dr. Evan Quinn
 Frank Vincent as Uncle Charles
 Vincent Pastore as Casper Black
 Chuck Zito as Captain Sallie
 Ace Frehley as Johnny
 Maureen Van Zandt as Wanda
 Cane as Mick
 Rick Aiello as Tom

 Kelly Michaels as Detective Sloane
 Nicholas Reiner as Josh
 Candice Coke as Michelle
 Ina Rosenthal as Mrs. Waxman
 Krie Alden as Mindy
 Susan Mitchell as Mona
 Holly Perkins as Ariel
 Sarah Ford Smith as Kate
 Kathryn Comperatore as Kathy
 Adonis Kapsalis as Art Dealer

Reception

During May 2005, Howard Stern discussed the premiere of Remedy on The Howard Stern Show, at which he spoke to Steven Van Zandt (whose wife Maureen appears in the film) and Danny Aiello about Howard's recent conflicts with the Federal Communications Commission.

References

External links 
 
 Remedy at the Internet Movie Database
 Starline Films
 Starline Films news

American crime drama films
Films about drugs
Culture of New York City
2005 crime drama films
2005 films
2000s English-language films
2000s American films